Vaughan was a federal electoral district in Ontario, Canada, that has been represented in the House of Commons of Canada from 2004 until 2015.

The riding covered the fast-growing region of Vaughan north of Toronto, Ontario.

The riding was created in 2003 from parts of Vaughan—King—Aurora riding. It consisted of the part of the City of Vaughan that lies west of Highway 400 or north of Rutherford Road.

Political geography
The riding was divided between the rural and urban parts. The Conservative concentrations in the riding can be found in the more rural parts, in the north and east parts of the riding, like the community of Kleinburg. The rest of the riding, the more suburban southern part is strongly Liberal.

Demographics
According to the Canada 2006 Census

Racial groups: 74.3% White, 9.3% South Asian, 2.7% Latin American, 2.5% Black, 2.4% Southeast Asian, 2.4% Chinese, 1.7% West Asian, 1.7% Filipino, 1.0% Arab 
Languages: 44.8% English, 0.5% French, 54.6% Other 
Religions (2001): 77.0% Catholic, 7.3% Protestant, 2.7% Muslim, 2.6% Christian Orthodox, 2.1% Sikh, 1.6% Hindu, 1.3% Buddhist, 3.9% No religion
Average income: $34,485

The Vaughan riding had the highest percentage of Italian Canadians in all of Canada (54.4%). 17.1% of its residents are Italian immigrants, the highest such percentage for a Canadian federal riding, and 19.2% of its residents having Italian as their mother tongue.

Members of Parliament

This riding has elected the following Members of Parliament:

Election results

|align="right"|

|-

|align="left" colspan=2|Liberal hold
|align="right"|Swing
|align="right"| -9.4
|align="right"|
|align="right"|

|align="left" colspan=2|Liberal hold
|align="right"|Swing
|align="right"| -2.8
|align="right"|

		

|align="left" colspan=2|Liberal hold
|align="right"|Swing
|align="right"| -8.1
|align="right"|

^ % Change is based on redistributed results. Conservative change is from a combination of Progressive Conservative and Canadian Alliance parties.

See also
 List of Canadian federal electoral districts
 Past Canadian electoral districts

References

Notes

External links
Riding history from the Library of Parliament
 Campaign expense data from Elections Canada

Former federal electoral districts of Ontario
Politics of Vaughan